The Eadon Green Black Cuillin is a British concept car built by Eadon Green and introduced at the 2017 Geneva Motor Show.

Design 
The design of the Black Cuillin is inspired by that of the 1937 Alfa Romeo 8C 2900 and was designed with CAD.

Specifications 
The concept Black Cuillin features a full carbon fibre body but Eadon Green founder Felix Eaton says a production model would use an aluminum body. It is powered by a modern V12 engine that reportedly comes from a "high-end European manufacturer.", the identity of which has not been revealed.

References 

Cars introduced in 2017
Retro-style automobiles
Concept cars
Eadon Green vehicles